Psorthaspis brimleyi is a species of spider wasp in the family Pompilidae.

References

Further reading

External links

 
 

Pompilinae
Insects described in 1928